Arthur Chase may refer to:

 Arthur Adalbert Chase (1874–?), British cyclist
 Arthur E. Chase (1930–2015), American businessman and politician